Alexio Churu Muchabaiwa (born 21 June 1939 in Wedza) is a Zimbabwean clergyman and bishop for the Roman Catholic Diocese of Mutare. He became ordained as a priest by Archbishop Markaal on 24 August 1968 at Mount St. Mary’s Mission in Wedza under the Archddiocese of Harare. He was appointed bishop of Umtali in 1981 and was ordained as a bishop of Umtali in 1982. He retired in 2016.

References

External links

1939 births
Living people
20th-century Roman Catholic bishops in Zimbabwe
21st-century Roman Catholic bishops in Zimbabwe
People from Wedza District
Roman Catholic bishops of Mutare